The Special Anti-Terrorist Unit of Ministry of Interior of Republika Srpska (SAJ, ; САЈ) is a special police and security force unit of the Police of Republika Srpska, one of two autonomous entities that comprise Bosnia and Herzegovina.

History 
Development of unit it is possible to split into three stages: first stage (1992–1995), second stage (1995–2001) and third stage (2001–today). Special Anti-Terrorist Unit of Ministry of Republika Srpska was founded on April 4, 1992 as Special Police Brigade (Специјална бригада полиције). During the War in Bosnia and Herzegovina it was a unit that fought in many battles. In that time, brigades command was in Janja near Bijeljina and unit was divided on nine battalion-sized detachments : 
 I - Pale 
 II - Šekovići 
 III - Trebinje 
 IV - Bijeljina 
 V - Doboj 
 VI - Banja Luka 
 VII - Prijedor 
 VIII - Ilidža 
 IX - Foča.
Every detachment was capable to be independent on battle field because of its organisation. Detachment had three special infantry platoons, armored-mechanized platoon, mortar, logistic and communication platoon.
The brigade numbered around 1,400 fighters, of whom 144 were killed and about 400 wounded.
Second development stage is considered for peace time when command was in Janja and when brigade was renamed into Specialized Police Service (Служба специјализоване полиције). Two detachments were disbanded (Prijedor and Ilidža) and Trebinje and Foča detachments were integrated into Tjentište base. Later all detachments except Janja and Banja Luka were disbanded and in Banja Luka was formed Anti-Terrorist Team. 
Third stage is stage in whom units command was dislocated in Rakovačke Bare in Banja Luka. Specialized Police Service was organized on three teams: Anti-Terrorist, Specialized and Mechanized. On 2004 service changed name into Special Police Unit (Специјална јединица полиције or СЈП) and next year base was moved in central base "Sarica" in Trn near Banja Luka. In 2016, the unit assumed its current name and its headquarters were moved to Zalužani.

Unit today 

Today SAU is most elite unit of Ministry of Interior of Republika Srpska and cooperates with other special units in region and Europe, like for example Serbian SAJ, PTJ and Gendarmery and Slovene SEP, French GIGN German GSG 9, Italian GIS. 
Main duties of unit are:
 organizing and completing of most complex  security and counter terrorism tasks 
 establishing of public order and peace in most difficult and risk situations 
 solving high risk situations

Organization  
Unit has its own command that is inferior to Director of Police and superior to seven teams: "A" Team (responsible for most difficult tasks), "B" Team, "C" Team, "D" Team, Special Preparation and Logistic Support Team (Тим за специјалну и логистичку подршку), Specialized Team (Специјализовани тим) and Operative Support Team (Тим за оперативну подршку).

Equipment

Armament

Vehicles

See also 
Police of Republika Srpska
Ministry of Interior (Republika Srpska)

References 

Republika Srpska
Police of Republika Srpska
Non-military counterterrorist organizations
1992 establishments in Bosnia and Herzegovina